Fitz and the Dizzyspells is the fifth EP by American singer-songwriter Andrew Bird, released on May 11, 2009. "See the Enemy" is a reworked version of the song "Anonanimal", and "Ten-You-Us" is an alternate version of "Tenuousness", both from the album Noble Beast.

Track listing

Andrew Bird albums
2009 EPs